Events in the year 1935 in China.

Incumbents
President: Lin Sen
Premier: Wang Jingwei until December 1, Chiang Kai-shek
Vice Premier: Kung Hsiang-hsi
Foreign Minister: Zhang Qun

Events
January - Zunyi Conference
January–February 5 - First Encirclement Campaign against Hubei–Henan–Shaanxi Soviet
February–April 18 - Second Encirclement Campaign against Hubei–Henan–Shaanxi Soviet
April–July - Second Encirclement Campaign against the Shaanxi-Gansu Soviet
May 29 - Battle of Luding Bridge
June 10 - He–Umezu Agreement
June 27 - Chin–Doihara Agreement
August 20-October 25 - Third Encirclement Campaign against the Shaanxi-Gansu Soviet

Births
 January 7 – Li Shengjiao, diplomat and international jurist (d. 2017)
 July 7 – Chan Wing-chan, politician
 July 13 – Qiu Xigui, historian, palaeographer and professor
 July 18 – Luo Gan, politician
 September 1 – Chow Yei-ching, Hong Kong executive (d. 2018)
 December 6 – Shan Tianfang, Pingshu performer (d. 2018)
 Yao Youxin
 Zhou Bangxin
 Chen Yaobang
 Lin Xiling
 Ye Liansong

Deaths
January 24 - Lu Diping
March 8 - Ruan Lingyu
April 25 - Mao Zetian
May 13 - Liu Zhennian
June 18 - Qu Qiubai
July 17 - Nie Er
August 6 - Fang Zhimin

 
1930s in China
Years of the 20th century in China